The Broad Bottom ministry was the factional coalition government of Great Britain between 1744 and 1754. It was led by the two Pelham brothers in Parliament, Prime Minister Henry Pelham in the House of Commons and the Duke of Newcastle in the House of Lords.

Early in 1746 the King wished a change of prime minister, and Pelham lost power, but only briefly. On returning to office he put in place a strengthened broad coalition of Whigs. The second Broad Bottom administration lasted from Pelham's resumption of power until his death in 1754.

Ministry

See also
 1747 British general election

Notes

References

 
 
 
 
 

British ministries
Government
1744 establishments in Great Britain
1746 establishments in Great Britain
1746 disestablishments in Great Britain
1754 disestablishments in Great Britain
1740s in Great Britain
1750s in Great Britain
Ministries of George II of Great Britain